The Marinestosstruppkompanie (MSK) (marine attack troop company) was a secret naval infantry of the Kriegsmarine formation formed in 1938 in Swinemünde from Marine-Artillerie-Abteilung 123.

In September 1938, a reinforced platoon led by Lt. Walter Schug embarked on the  headed for Spain, where it blew up a Republican radio station on the island of Ibiza.

In March 1939, MSK was among German forces occupying Memelland. Under the command of Oblt. Wilhelm Henningsen the MSK trained for future missions.

In the early hours of 1 September 1939, MSK disembarked Schleswig-Holstein in order to attack the Polish military transit depot Westerplatte in Danzig harbour. After the fall of the fortress, MSK was used in the occupation of Gdynia and in the battle of Hel peninsula.

MSK remained active for the rest of World War II mainly on the Eastern Front.

References

External links 
 Report in Ostpreußen-Anzeiger

Military units and formations of the Kriegsmarine
Military units and formations established in 1938
German World War II special forces